Dowrahan Rural District is in Gandoman District of Borujen County, Chaharmahal and Bakhtiari province, Iran. At the census of 2006, its population was 5,497 in 1,338 households; there were 5,152 inhabitants in 1,433 households at the following census of 2011; and in the most recent census of 2016, the population of the rural district was 4,890 in 1,449 households. The largest of its 15 villages was Emam Qeys, with 2,758 people.

References 

Borujen County

Rural Districts of Chaharmahal and Bakhtiari Province

Populated places in Chaharmahal and Bakhtiari Province

Populated places in Borujen County